Örükzar is a village in Batken Region of Kyrgyzstan. Located in Burgondu valley, which is on the south fringe of Fergana valley. Its population was 3,374 in 2021.

References

Populated places in Batken Region